ROKS Gwangmyeong (PCC-782) is a  of the Republic of Korea Navy.

Development and design 

The Pohang class is a series of corvettes built by different Korean shipbuilding companies. The class consists of 24 ships and some after decommissioning were sold or given to other countries. There are five different types of designs in the class from Flight II to Flight VI.

Construction and career 
Gwangmyeong was launched on 27 October 1989 by Hanjin Heavy Industries. The vessel was commissioned on 9 July 1990.

References
 

Ships built by Hanjin Heavy Industries
Pohang-class corvettes
1989 ships
Corvettes of the Cold War